George Farrington (12 June 1882 – 1960) was an English footballer who played in the Football League for Preston North End.

References

1882 births
1960 deaths
English footballers
Association football forwards
English Football League players
West Bromwich Albion F.C. players
Preston North End F.C. players